Badlands of Montana is a 1957 American Western film written and directed by Daniel B. Ullman. The film stars Rex Reason, Margia Dean, Beverly Garland, Keith Larsen, Emile Meyer and William Edward Phipps. The film was released on May 1, 1957, by 20th Century Fox.

Plot

The plot follows Steven Brewster, a mayoral candidate who is tricked into a gunfight and kills his opponent. He then takes up with a gang of badlands outlaws and takes part in robberies. After being wounded and captured, his friends rescue him and bring him back to Helena where he is elected sheriff.

Cast 
 Rex Reason as Steven Brewster
 Margia Dean as Emily Branton
 Beverly Garland as Susan Hammer
 Keith Larsen as Rick Valentine
 Emile Meyer as Henry Harrison Hammer 
 William Edward Phipps as Walt Branton
 Stanley Farrar as Jake Rayburn
 Rankin Mansfield as Doc Travis
 John Pickard as Vince Branton
 Ralph Peters as Sammy Fielding
 Paul Newlan as Marshal at Helena
 Russ Bender as George Johannson
 Robert Cunningham as Paul Johansson
 Jack Kruschen as Cavalry Sergeant
 Lee Tung Foo as Ling

References

External links 
 
 Badlands of Montana at TCMDB
 Badlands of Montana at BFI

1957 films
1957 Western (genre) films
American Western (genre) films
20th Century Fox films
1950s English-language films
1950s American films